The Australian Women's Cricket Championships was a women's cricket competition which ran from 1931 until 1996. It usually operated as a first-class competition, with matches played over two days. Later editions included limited overs cricket instead of, or alongside, two-day matches.

For the most part, the competition was held annually within a two-week timeframe and contested primarily by teams from the six states of Australia plus the ACT. Player performance at each tournament was used as a guide to determining Australian team selection for future international fixtures. It was the country's first formalised interstate women's cricket competition, with teams having previously only played one-off and friendly matches. Victoria was the most successful team, winning a total of 36 titles. The tournament was replaced in 1996–97 by the Women's National Cricket League.

History

1931–1940: Pre-War years 
The inaugural edition of the Australian Women's Cricket Championships took place from 21 to 25 March 1931, involving New South Wales, Queensland and Victoria. Matches were played with two innings per team in a single day and are not considered to have first-class status. The first match, between New South Wales and Victoria, was abandoned without a ball bowled. New South Wales and Victoria then both won their respective matches against Queensland. A second match was played between New South Wales and Victoria, resulting in victory for the former. Records kept by Women's Cricket Australia—the national governing body for the female branch of the sport until its merger with the Australian Cricket Board in 2003—indicate New South Wales were crowned as champions.

Matches were extended to two days for the 1933–34 tournament and were considered to have first-class status for the first time. South Australia joined in 1934–35, taking the number of teams up to four, and made their second appearance in 1936–37 which coincided with the debut of Western Australia.

1947–1972: Guest teams 
After a hiatus caused by World War II, the tournament resumed in 1946–47 which saw Victoria defeat New South Wales in the final. South Australia won their first title in 1951–52. In 1956–57, New Zealand made a one-off appearance, while Queensland and South Australia fielded a combined team. For the 1959–60 tournament, New Zealand domestic team Auckland and a Victoria Second XI made sole appearances, while Queensland and South Australia—for the second and last time—once again fielded a combined team. In 1960–61, Queensland and Western Australia fielded a combined team for the first and only time. In 1962–63, Canterbury featured for a single occasion, while in 1967–68 fellow New Zealand domestic team Otago also made a one-off appearance.

1973–1978: Single-innings matches added 
Following the introduction of One Day International cricket, the 1972–73 season saw the addition of single-innings matches to the competition for the first time. The tournament, which was won by Victoria, used a 60-overs-per-side format for all games as preparation for the inaugural Women's Cricket World Cup. The next three editions reverted to two-day first-class matches, before the 1976–77 tournament was once again played as a limited overs competition ahead of the second Women's Cricket World Cup.

1978–1990: Expansion 
Australian Capital Territory joined the competition in 1978–79 and Tasmania made their first appearance in 1985–86. Matches from 1978–79 to 1989–90 were held over two days with the exceptions of 1981–82 and 1987–88, when they played as 60-over affairs as preparation for upcoming World Cup tournaments. The number of matches increased during this period, with each team playing as many as 12 matches in 1987–88. Western Australia won their first title in 1986–87.

1990–1996: Hybrid format, WNCL succession 
The 1990–91 tournament introduced a hybrid format whereby group stage games were played as 60-over matches, followed by a finals series with matches played over two days. From 1991–92, 50-over matches were played instead of 60-over matches. The hybrid format lasted for five seasons.

The 1995–96 tournament was the final edition of the Australian Women's Cricket Championships. It was played as a 50-over competition with no two-day matches. Victoria won the tournament, beating New South Wales in the final by ten runs. The competition was succeeded by the Women's National Cricket League (WNCL) which took place for the first time in 1996–97. The introduction of the WNCL meant the country's top domestic competition would change from a two-week tournament to a fully-fledged national league in which games would be played on a home-and-away basis across the course of a season. Women's cricket in Australia has since undergone a highly successful transformative phase, especially with regards to the sport's rising level of professionalism among its elite female players.

Teams 

Source:

Results

See also 

 Australia women's national cricket team
 Women's cricket in Australia
 Women's National Cricket League

References

External links 
 National Champions at Women's Cricket Australia

Cricket
Women's cricket competitions in Australia
Australian domestic cricket competitions
Sports leagues established in 1931
Recurring sporting events established in 1931
1931 establishments in Australia
Sports leagues disestablished in 1996
Recurring sporting events disestablished in 1996
1996 disestablishments in Australia
Defunct cricket leagues